Kim San-ho (born February 12, 1982) is a South Korean actor. Kim is best known in musical theatre, having starred in Korean stage productions of Grease, The Fantasticks and the Kim Kwang-seok jukebox musical The Days. On television, he has also appeared in the drama Love, My Love and several seasons of the sitcom Rude Miss Young-ae.

Musical theatre

Filmography

Film

Television series

Web series

Variety show

Music video

References

External links 
 
 
 
 
 

1982 births
Living people
South Korean male musical theatre actors
South Korean male television actors
South Korean male film actors
Seoul Institute of the Arts alumni